Jane Thomson may refer to:
 Jane Thomson (mountaineer) (1858–1944), New Zealand mountaineer
 Jane Thomson (actress) (1827–1901), Australian stage actor and dancer

See also
 Jane Thompson, American urbanist, designer and planner